Antoni Abraham (December 19, 1869, Zdrada - June 23, 1923) was a Polish promoter of Pomeranian culture, Kashubian activist and popular writer.

References

External links
Further info

1869 births
1923 deaths
People from Puck County
People from West Prussia
Kashubians
Polish activists
Polish male writers
Knights of the Order of Polonia Restituta